Parmotrema marcellianum is a species of saxicolous (rock-dwelling), foliose lichen in the family Parmeliaceae. Found on the Galápagos Islands, it was formally described as a new species in 2019 by lichenologists Frank Bungartz and Adriano Spielmann. The species epithet honours the authors' colleague Marcelo Pinto Marcelli, "in recognition of his work on the lichen family Parmeliaceae".

Description

The upper thallus surface of Parmotrema marcellianum is whitish-gray and can be shiny or dull. The surface is densely marked with a net-like pattern and is often cracked. The soredia are typically creamy white and have a granular texture. The lobes are small and narrow, ranging from 0.5 to 2.5 mm in width, and are abundantly . The cilia are black, mostly , and can be up to 1 mm long. The lower surface of the lichen is blackened throughout or strongly dark brown at the very edge of the lobes, with the rhizines growing all the way to the edge of the lobe. There is no distinct deep brown rhizine-free lower margin, but the lower  can be mottled white, especially below the clavulae. The rhizines, where present, are long, slender, and black, mostly simple, and occasionally sparsely branched. The medulla is white. No apothecia were observed among the collected specimens, but there are immersed, spherical pycnidia with brownish-black ostioles.

The  contains atranorin, while the medulla has salazinic acid. The expected results of standard chemical spot tests in the cortex are P+ (yellow),K+ (yellow), KC−, C−, UV−; and in the medulla P+ (deep yellow), K+ (yellowish turning dark red), KC−, C−, UV−.

See also
List of Parmotrema species

References

marcellianum
Lichen species
Lichens described in 2019
Lichens of the Galápagos Islands